Dunkirk is a town in Chautauqua County, New York, United States. The population was 1,257 at the 2020 census.

The town of Dunkirk is split into two sections, east and west, by the city of Dunkirk, which is a separate entity.

History 
The area was first settled circa 1808. Development was slow until the New York and Erie Railroad established a station in Dunkirk village in 1851. The town of Dunkirk was established in 1859 from the northern portion of the town of Pomfret. The village of Dunkirk was incorporated in 1837, becoming a city in 1888.

The first naval skirmish in the War of 1812 began in Lake Erie near the mouth of Canadaway Creek, which is now within the boundaries of the western part of the town. A small marker commemorating the event sits near the intersection of Route 5 and Temple Street.

Geography

The New York State Thruway (Interstate 90) and NY Route 5 pass through the town. The town of Dunkirk is served by the Buffalo-Chicago main lines of both CSX Transportation and the Norfolk Southern Railway.

The town of Dunkirk is split into an east section and a west section by the city of Dunkirk, which is located in the middle.

Adjacent towns and areas
(Clockwise)
Lake Erie 
Sheridan 
Pomfret; Fredonia 
Lake Erie

Demographics

As of the census of 2000, there were 1,387 people, 519 households, and 333 families residing in the town.  The population density was 222.1 people per square mile (85.8/km2).  There were 602 housing units at an average density of 96.4 per square mile (37.2/km2).  The racial makeup of the town was 94.16% White, 2.24% Black or African American, 0.58% Native American, 0.07% Asian, 1.66% from other races, and 1.30% from two or more races. Hispanic or Latino of any race were 4.33% of the population.

There were 519 households, out of which 22.5% had children under the age of 18 living with them, 49.1% were married couples living together, 10.4% had a female householder with no husband present, and 35.8% were non-families. 30.3% of all households were made up of individuals, and 13.5% had someone living alone who was 65 years of age or older.  The average household size was 2.27 and the average family size was 2.78.

In the town, the population was spread out, with 15.6% under the age of 18, 5.8% from 18 to 24, 20.3% from 25 to 44, 27.2% from 45 to 64, and 31.1% who were 65 years of age or older.  The median age was 50 years. For every 100 females, there were 85.9 males.  For every 100 females age 18 and over, there were 81.4 males.

The median income for a household in the town was $33,553, and the median income for a family was $40,000. Males had a median income of $32,692 versus $23,194 for females. The per capita income for the town was $19,124.  About 7.1% of families and 11.7% of the population were below the poverty line, including 19.5% of those under age 18 and 3.8% of those age 65 or over.

Communities and locations in Dunkirk
Canadaway Creek – The War of 1812 began near the mouth of Canadaway Creek.

References

External links
 Town of Dunkirk official website

Populated places established in 1808
Towns in Chautauqua County, New York
1808 establishments in New York (state)